Ezra Harm Ruud Walian (born 22 October 1997) is a professional footballer who plays as a forward or attacking midfielder for Liga 1 club Persib Bandung and the Indonesia national team.

Early life
Walian was born in Amsterdam, his father, Glenn Walian, is Indonesian of Manadonese (Minahasan) descent, while his mother is Dutch. He progressed through the ranks of the Ajax Youth Academy, having joined from the academy of AZ Alkmaar, eventually joining the reserves' team Jong Ajax in 2016.

Club career

Ajax
Walian is a youth exponent from Ajax. He made his professional debut at Jong Ajax on 26 September 2016 in an Eerste Divisie game against FC Oss. He left Jong Ajax after contract ended on 30 June 2017.

In July and August 2017, Walian had trials with three English club sides Bolton Wanderers, Hull City and West Ham United.

Almere City
On 29 August 2017 it was announced that Walian had signed with Ajax affiliates' Almere City for 2 years, competing in the Dutch Eerste Divisie.
He made his debut in the Almere City FC game against Helmond Sport. On 6 October 2017, Walian scored his first goal for Almere City in the 76th minute against MVV Maastricht.

RKC Waalwijk (loan)
He was signed for RKC Waalwijk to play in the Eerste Divisie, on loan from Almere City. Walian made his debut on 24 August 2018 in a match against Den Bosch. On 17 November 2018, Walian scored his first goal for RKC Waalwijk in the 32nd minute against Helmond Sport.

PSM Makassar
On September 7, 2019, Walian signed three and a half years contract with Indonesian Liga 1 side PSM Makassar. He made his debut on 19 September 2019 in a match against Persikabo 1973. On 27 September 2019, Walian scored his first goal for PSM in a 3–1 lose over Persipura Jayapura at the Gelora Delta Stadium. On 16 October 2019, he scored in a 6–2 win over Arema. Walian made 19 league appearances and scored 3 goals for PSM Makassar.

Persib Bandung
He was announced to have signed a three-year contract with the West Java club on 14 March 2021 during Persib's 88th anniversary celebration He made his league debut on 4 September by starting in a 1–0 win against Barito Putera.

International career 

Walian represented the Netherlands at youth level, from the under-15s to under-19s, on 19 October 2013 while playing for the Netherlands U-17 team, he scored 5 goals in his debut against San Marino of the 2014 UEFA European Under-17 Championship qualifying round in a 12–0 win. He was eligible to represent the Netherlands or Indonesia at full international level through his parents; his mother being Dutch and his father Indonesian.

On 20 March 2017, Walian officially became an Indonesian citizen through naturalization.

Walian was given his first call-up by Indonesia manager Luis Milla for a friendly against Myanmar on 21 March 2017.
He made his debut for Indonesia after coming on as a substitute in the start of second half.

In November 2021, Walian was called up to the Indonesia national team in a friendly match in Turkey against Afghanistan and Myanmar by Shin Tae-yong. Walian scored his first international goal on 25 November 2021, in a 4–1 win against Myanmar. In December 2021, he was named in Indonesian's squad for the 2020 AFF Championship in Singapore. On 12 December 2021, Walian scored a goal against Laos in a 2020 AFF Championship group stage. On 25 December 2021, he scored again against Singapore in the second leg of semi-final in a 4–2 victory after extra-time.

Career statistics

Club

International

International goals 
Netherlands U-17

Indonesia U-23

Indonesia

Honours
Ajax A1 (U-19)
 Eredivisie U-19: 2013–14, 2014–15, 2015–16
Jong Ajax
 Eerste Divisie runner-up: 2016–17

Indonesia U-23
 Southeast Asian Games Bronze medal: 2017

Indonesia
 AFF Championship runner-up: 2020

Individual
 Menpora Cup Best Eleven: 2021

References

External links
 
 

1997 births
Living people
Footballers from Amsterdam
Indonesian footballers
Indonesia international footballers
Indonesia youth international footballers
Dutch footballers
Netherlands youth international footballers
Indonesian people of Dutch descent
Indo people
Dutch people of Indonesian descent
Indonesian expatriate footballers
Indonesian expatriate sportspeople in the Netherlands
Expatriate footballers in the Netherlands
Jong Ajax players
Almere City FC players
RKC Waalwijk players
PSM Makassar players
Persib Bandung players
Eerste Divisie players
Liga 1 (Indonesia) players
Naturalised citizens of Indonesia
Minahasa people
Southeast Asian Games bronze medalists for Indonesia
Southeast Asian Games medalists in football
Competitors at the 2017 Southeast Asian Games
Association football forwards